From the Wrong Side of the Aperture is the second studio album of the Serbian metal band Draconic. The album was recorded in 2008, and released in 2009 through Austrian label Noisehead Records. The album marked the band's shift from symphonic black metal towards progressive metal.

Track listing
All songs written and performed by Draconic.
 "Through Escape" - 5:34
 "Opaque" - 5:20
 "The Amnesia Transmissions" - 4:27
 "This Time There Would be No Witnesses" - 4:42
 "Bleak Future Trauma" - 2:09
 "The Imbecile" - 7:23
 "Murder The Distance" - 4:11
 "Of the Pulse and the Iris" - 5:11
 "Laudanum" - 12:04

Reception
The album was generally well received by the Serbian reviewers. Vladimir Ninčić of Popboks stated that From the Wrong Side of the Aperture presents the first world-class metal record from Serbia. On the other hand, German Stormbringer gave this album 2.5/5 stars, praising the band's technicality and will to successfully break through the autistic Serbian metal scene, but criticized the band with the statement that the album was not a unique piece of metal, musically speaking.

Personnel
 David Lazar Galić - bass guitar, vocals
 Miloš "MC Mike" Kovačević - drums 
 Branislav Stanković - keyboards, vocals
 Marjan Mijić - vocals, recording, producer
 Uroš Andrijašević - guitar
 Vanja Dušan Andrijašević - guitar

Additional personnel
 Nikola Mijić - recording, producer
 Marko Galić - keyboards (on "Of the Pulse and the Iris")
 Valter Cijan - album art

References

External links
 Popboks Review 
 Interview with David Lazar Galić on Popboks

Draconic albums
2009 albums